Arnold Joseph D'Arcy (born 13 January 1933) is an English retired professional footballer who played as a left winger in the Football League.

References

1933 births
Living people
Footballers from Blackburn
English footballers
Wigan Athletic F.C. players
Accrington Stanley F.C. (1891) players
Swindon Town F.C. players
Cheltenham Town F.C. players
English Football League players
Association football wingers